Qarah Quyun-e Shomali Rural District is in the Central District of Showt County, West Azerbaijan province, Iran. At the National Census of 2006, its population (as a part of the former Showt District of Maku County) was 6,170 in 1,366 households. There were 6,140 inhabitants in 1,647 households at the following census of 2011, by which time the district had been separated from the county, Showt County established, and divided into two districts: the Central District and Qarah Quyun Districts. At the most recent census of 2016, the population of the rural district was 5,284 in 1,592 households. The largest of its 26 villages was Sufi, with 5,284 people.

References 

Showt County

Rural Districts of West Azerbaijan Province

Populated places in West Azerbaijan Province

Populated places in Showt County